Blackout is a 2008 Finnish film written and directed by JP Siili.

Main cast 

Petteri Summanen as Pekka Valinto 
Jenni Banerjee as Laura Koskimies 
Irina Björklund as Anne Hartela 
Ismo Kallio as Ismo Valinto 
Lena Meriläinen as Hanna Kajaste 
Mikko Kouki as Juha Pasanen  
Mari Perankoski as Mari Koski 
Mikko Leppilampi as Kari Tuikkanen  
Eppu Salminen as Arto Suominen
Risto Kaskilahti as Risto Vierikko
Eero Milonoff
Eeva Putro as Annen avustaja

References

External links
 

Finnish thriller films
2008 films
Films directed by JP Siili
2000s Finnish-language films